In Pursuit of Greed (also known as Assassinators) is a science fiction-themed first-person shooter (FPS) video game released in 1995 for DOS , developed by Mind Shear Software and published by Softdisk.

Release
After Mind Shear Software's release of Ironseed in 1994, Softdisk Publishing reached out to them with the suggestion that they take advantage of the pre-alpha Doom code that Softdisk had access to in order to create a shooter, in the hopes of capitalizing on the popularity of Doom. (This was Id's Raven engine, licensed to Raven Software for their 1993 game ShadowCaster.) Mind Shear agreed enthusiastically, expecting that they would be working on a nearly complete Doom engine. Only after contracts were signed and development was underway did they discover just how buggy and incomplete the codebase was. Problems with lag, jerky animation, and slow rendering plagued the project right up until a significantly delayed release.

The game was re-released under the name Assassinators by Memorex Software in 1998.

The game and its source code were released as non-commercial freeware by the programmer around 2014.

Reception
Reception of the game by press and gamers was mostly unimpressed to negative. However, some game aspects like curved surfaces, the "rear mirror" mechanic, and the colorful protagonists were positively mentioned. Also the soundtrack, done by Andrew Sega, was positively noted. The game was not the hoped for commercial success due to the technical problems with the unfinished engine and the competing high-profile title Duke Nukem 3D, released shortly before Greed, which lead to a cool reception from the press and the public alike.

The game received a 59/100 in the PC Gamer August 1996 issue, stating "The Doom frenzy breeds another strange offspring, where mercenary cows, lizards, and cyborgs kill for sport. It's all pretty forgettable.".

Home of the Underdogs gave it a 7/10 saying "All in all, if you have enough patience to slog through the first few levels, you will find an interesting and above-average game lurking behind the tedious beginning. It is by no means a classic, but it's worth a look." Old PC Gaming gave In Pursuit of Greed 2.5 stars calling it "not a particularly irredeemable game, just somewhat formulaic and woefully outdated"

References

External links

Source code at archive.org

1995 video games
DOS games
DOS-only games
Science fiction video games
First-person shooters
Video games with 2.5D graphics
Commercial video games with freely available source code
Video games developed in the United States
Video games scored by Andrew Sega
Sprite-based first-person shooters
id Tech games
WizardWorks games
Multiplayer and single-player video games